Edmund Malecki (1 November 1914 – 21 April 2001) was a German international footballer.

Honours 

 German championship winner: 1938

References

External links 
 
 Player Profile at wormatia.de 

1914 births
2001 deaths
Footballers from Hanover
Association football forwards
German footballers
Germany international footballers
SV Arminia Hannover players
Hannover 96 players
Wormatia Worms players
FC Admira Wacker Mödling players
German Army soldiers of World War II
Recipients of the Iron Cross (1939), 1st class